Douglas Millward (1862 – after 1888) was an English footballer who played for Stoke.

Career
Millward played for local side Stoke Priory before joining Stoke in 1887. He played once for Stoke in the FA Cup during the 1887–88 season which came in a 4–1 defeat to West Bromwich Albion. He left the club at the end of the season and went on to play for Leek.

Career statistics

References

1862 births
Year of death missing
Footballers from Stoke-on-Trent
English footballers
Association football forwards
Stoke City F.C. players
Leek F.C. players